The following is a list of adjectival and demonymic forms of countries and nations in English and their demonymic equivalents.  A country adjective describes something as being from that country, for example, "Italian cuisine" is "cuisine of Italy".  A country demonym denotes the people or the inhabitants of or from there, for example, "Germans" are people of or from Germany.
Note: Demonyms are given in plural forms. Singular forms simply remove the final s or, in the case of -ese endings, are the same as the plural forms. The ending -men has feminine equivalent -women (i.e. Irishman, Scotswoman). The French terminations  /  serve as both the singular and plural masculine; adding e ( / ) makes them singular feminine; es ( / ) makes them plural feminine. The plural forms are usually  and  respectively.

Adjectives ending in -ish can be used as collective demonyms (e.g. the English, the Cornish). So can those ending in -ch / -tch (e.g. the French, the Dutch) provided they are pronounced with a 'ch' sound (e.g. the adjective Czech does not qualify).

Many place-name adjectives and many demonyms refer also to various other things, sometimes with and sometimes without one or more additional words. (Sometimes, the use of one or more additional words is optional.) Notable examples are cuisines, cheeses, cat breeds, dog breeds, and horse breeds. (See List of words derived from toponyms.)

In cases where two or more adjectival forms are given, there is often a subtle difference in usage between the two. This is particularly the case with Central Asian countries, where one form tends to relate to the nation and the other tends to relate to the predominant ethnic group (e.g. Uzbek is primarily an ethnicity, Uzbekistani relates to citizens of Uzbekistan).

In addition, several countries have a large number of sub-names for their citizens in the form of nicknames for people of certain different areas; these are usually related to something typical of the area. In Puerto Rico for example, people who come from the town of Bayamón are referred to as "Cowboy(s)" or "Cowgirl(s)"; those from Caguas are referred to as "Criollo(s)" or "Criolla(s)". Such sub-names are not listed here.

List

See also

Demonym
List of adjectival and demonymic forms of place names
List of adjectivals and demonyms for astronomical bodies
List of adjectivals and demonyms for continental regions
List of adjectivals and demonyms for subcontinental regions
List of adjectival and demonymic forms for countries and nations
List of adjectivals and demonyms for Australia
List of adjectivals and demonyms for Canada
List of adjectivals and demonyms for Cuba
List of adjectivals and demonyms for India
List of adjectivals and demonyms for Malaysia
List of adjectivals and demonyms for Mexico
List of adjectivals and demonyms for New Zealand
List of adjectivals and demonyms for the Philippines
List of adjectivals and demonyms for the United States
List of adjectivals and demonyms for cities
List of adjectivals and demonyms for former regions
List of adjectivals and demonyms for Greco-Roman antiquity
List of adjectivals and demonyms for fictional regions

Notes

References

External links

Alphabetical list of world demonyms
CIA World Factbook – NATIONALITY

Lists of place names
Countries